A craft is an occupation or trade requiring manual dexterity or artistic skill.

Craft or Crafts may also refer to:

Places
 Craft, California, a former settlement in Kern County, California, United States
 Craft, Texas, an unincorporated community in Cherokee County, Texas, United States
 Craft Glacier, a glacier of Antarctica

Periodicals
Craft (American magazine), American magazine published by O'Reilly Media
Craft (Japanese magazine), Japanese magazine published by Taiyoh Tosho

Art and entertainment
Craft (band), a Swedish black metal band formed in 1994
Craft, a British rock band from the 1980s–1990s formed by a former member of The Enid
 Craft (film), a Brazilian film directed by Gustavo Pizzi
 Crafts, fictional societies in the role-playing game Mage: The Ascension

Transport
 CRAFT (aviation), a mnemonic for the basic elements of a clearance in aviation
 Craft (vehicle)
 Aircraft
 Hovercraft
 Landing craft
 Spacecraft
 Watercraft

People with the name
Craft (surname) 
Crafts (surname)

Other uses
 Craft Academy for Excellence in Science and Mathematics
 Community Reinforcement Approach and Family Training (CRAFT)
 Craft brewery (craft beer)
 Craft service

See also
 Krafft (disambiguation)
 Kraft (disambiguation)
 The Craft (disambiguation)